South African Astronomical Observatory (SAAO) is the national centre for optical and infrared astronomy in South Africa. It was established in 1972. The observatory is run by the National Research Foundation of South Africa. The facility's function is to conduct research in astronomy and astrophysics.

The SAAO has links worldwide for scientific and technological collaboration. Instrumental contributions from the South African Astronomical Observatory include the development of a spherical aberration corrector and the Southern African Large Telescope (SALT).

The Noon Gun on Cape Town's Signal Hill is fired remotely by a time signal from the Observatory.

History 

The history of the SAAO began when the Royal Observatory at the Cape of Good Hope was founded in 1820, the first scientific institution in Africa. Construction of the main buildings was completed in 1829 at a cost of £30,000 (equivalent to £ in ).
The post of Her Majesty's astronomer at the Cape of Good Hope was awarded the Royal Medal on two occasions; the first to Thomas Maclear in 1869 for measurement of an arc of the meridian at the Cape of Good Hope and the second to David Gill in 1903 for researches in solar and stellar parallax, and his energetic direction of the Royal Observatory at the Cape of Good Hope.

The Republic Observatory, Johannesburg, was merged with the much older Royal Observatory, Cape of Good Hope in January 1972 to form the South African Astronomical Observatory. In 1974 the Radcliffe Observatory telescope was purchased by the CSIR and moved to Sutherland, where it recommenced work in 1976.

SAAO was established in January 1972, as a result of a joint agreement by the Council for Scientific and Industrial Research (CSIR) of South Africa and Science and Engineering Research Council (SERC) of United Kingdom. The headquarters are located on the grounds of the old Royal Observatory where the main building, offices, national library for astronomy and computer facilities are housed. Historic telescopes are also found at the headquarters in a number of domes and a small museum that displays scientific instruments. The South African Astronomical Observatory is administered at present as a National Facility under management of the National Research Foundation (NRF), formerly the Foundation for Research Development (FRD). In 1974, when the Radcliffe Observatory in Pretoria closed, the Council for Scientific and Industrial Research (CSIR) purchased the 1.9-m Radcliffe telescope and transported it to Sutherland.

Facilities 

The observatory operates from the campus of the Royal Observatory, Cape of Good Hope that was established in 1820 in the suburb of Observatory, Cape Town.

Sutherland was chosen because of its reliably clear and dark nights, but to ensure long term viability of the Karoo site astronomy instruments, the South African Parliament passed the Astronomy Geographic Advantage Act in 2007. The act gives the Minister of Science and Technology the authority to protect areas, through regulations, that are of strategic national importance for astronomy and related scientific endeavours.

Telescopes

0.50m telescope 

This  reflector was originally built for the Republic Observatory in 1967, but was moved to the Sutherland site in 1972. No longer in use.

The 20" telescope was replaced with the Meerlicht telescope. The 20" telescope was relocated to the University of Freestate Boyden observatory and commissioned in ~2019

0.75m telescope 

A  Grubb Parsons reflector.

1.0m Telescope 

This  telescope was originally located at SAAO Head office in Observatory, Cape Town, but has since moved to the Sutherland site. This telescope participates in the PLANET network.

1.9m Telescope 

The 1.9-m (74-inch) Radcliffe Telescope was commissioned for the Radcliffe Observatory in Pretoria where it was in use between 1948 and 1974. Following the closure of the Radcliffe Observatory it was moved to Sutherland where it became operational again in January 1976. Between 1951 and 2004 it was the largest telescope in South Africa. The telescope was manufactured by Sir Howard Grubb, Parsons and Co.

Alan Cousins Telescope (ACT) 

This  telescope was originally called the Automatic Photometric Telescope, but has been renamed the Alan Cousins Telescope in honour of Alan William James Cousins.

BiSON 

One of six telescopes in the Birmingham Solar Oscillations Network

Infrared Survey Facility (IRSF) 

The IRSF is a  reflector fitted with a 3 colour Infrared Imager. Originally built as part of the Magellanic Clouds A Thorough Study grant from the Japanese Ministry of Education, Culture, Sports, Science and Technology in 2000.
Other studies the telescope participated in include:
 The Indian Department of Space used this telescope for the Near Infrared Survey of the Nuclear Regions of the Milky Way to improve on data from the DENIS and 2MASS Astronomical surveys.

Las Cumbres Observatory Global Telescope Network 

Three  telescopes to form part of the LCOGT network were installed in early 2013.

MASTER 

The MASTER-SAAO Telescope (obs. code: K95) is part of the Russian Mobile Astronomical System of Telescope-Robots. It saw first light on 21 December 2014. It consists of two paired 0.4-m telescopes. In April 2015 it discovered the first comet from South Africa in 35 years, C/2015 G2 (MASTER).

MONET 

One of the two  telescopes of the MOnitoring NEtwork of Telescopes Project is located at Sutherland. Its twin can be found at the McDonald Observatory in Texas. The MONET telescopes are Robotic telescope controllable via the Internet and was constructed by the University of Göttingen. Remote Telescope Markup Language is used to control the telescopes remotely.

Project Solaris 

Two telescopes forming part of Project Solaris is located at the Sutherland site. Solaris-1 and Solaris-2 are both 0.5m f/15 Ritchey–Chrétien telescope. The aims of Project Solaris is to detect circumbinary planets around eclipsing binary stars and to characterise these binaries to improve stellar models.

Southern African Large Telescope (SALT) 

Observatory Code: B31
Observations: (Near Earth Objects)

SALT was inaugurated in November 2005. It is the largest single optical telescope in the Southern Hemisphere, with a hexagonal mirror array 11 meters across. SALT shares similarities with the Hobby-Eberly Telescope (HET) in Texas. The Southern African Large Telescope gathers twenty-five times as much light as any other existing African Telescope. With this larger mirror array, SALT can record distant stars, galaxies and quasars.

SuperWASP-South 

The Wide Angle Search for Planets consists of two robotic telescopes, the one located at SAAO Sutherland and the other at Roque de los Muchachos Observatory on the island of La Palma in the Canaries. WASP-17b, the first exoplanet known to have a retrograde orbit was discovered in 2009 using this array.

KELT-South 

KELT-South (Kilodegree Extremely Little Telescope South) is a small robotic telescope that is designed to detect transiting extrasolar planets. The telescope is owned and operated by Vanderbilt University and was based on the design of KELT-North, which was conceived and designed at the Ohio State University, Department of Astronomy. The KELT-South telescope will serve as a counterpart to its northern twin, surveying the southern sky for transiting planets over the next few years.

MeerLICHT 
Observatory Code: 

Optical wide-field telescope, installed in 2017. It has a  effective aperture, and a 1.65 x 1.65 degree field-of-view, sampled at 0.56"/pix. It was designed and manufactured in the Netherlands (Radboud University & NOVA) and is run by a consortium of Radboud University,University of Cape Town, the NRF/SAAO, the University of Oxford, the University of Manchester and the University of Amsterdam. It is the optical eye of MeerKAT, and has as its main-purpose to twin with the MeerKAT radio array to achieve a simultaneous optical-radio coverage of the Southern Skies. It is the prototype of the BlackGEM array, installed at ESO La Silla in Chile.

Yonsei Survey Telescopes for Astronomical Research (YSTAR) 
Observatory Code: 

The Yonsei Survey Telescopes for Astronomical Research (YSTAR), decommissioned in 2012, was used for the monitoring of variable stars and other transient events. YSTAR was a joint project between SAAO and the Yonsei University, Korea.

Geophysical

South African Geodynamic Observatory Sutherland (SAGOS) 

The GeoForschungsZentrum, Potsdam in co-operation with the National Research Foundation of South Africa constructed the SAGOS between 1998 and 2000.

SAGOS consist of a 1 Hz permanent GPS station, a superconducting gravimeter, meteorological sensors, and a tri-axial magnetometer. The GPS station is also used in support of the CHAllenging Minisatellite Payload (CHAMP) and Gravity Recovery and Climate Experiment (GRACE) space missions.

SUR Station 

The SUR station forms part of the International Deployment of Accelerometers Project and the Global Seismographic Network of the Incorporated Research Institutions for Seismology

See also 
 National Research Foundation of South Africa
 Astronomical Society of Southern Africa
 SEDS SEDS South Africa
 Other optical observatories and telescopes in South Africa
 Boyden Observatory
 Union Observatory
 Natal Observatory
 Radio observatories and telescopes in South Africa
 Hartebeesthoek Radio Astronomy Observatory
 MeerKAT
 Magnetic observatories in South Africa
 Hermanus Magnetic Observatory

References

Further reading

External links 

 Official Website
 SALT Homepage
 SALT milestones, first-light
 SALT milestones, inauguration
 BiSON Homepage
 SuperWASP Homepage
 KELT-South Homepage
 SuperWASP-South live status
 MeerLICHT homepage
 SUR listing at Project IDA
 South Africa's Giant New Observatory. Construction of the 1.9m Radcliffe Telescope, AP Archive.
 flicker

Astronomical observatories in South Africa
1972 establishments in South Africa
Research institutes established in 1972